Sztandar Wolności, was a Polish language newspaper published by the Communist Party of Byelorussia in the city of Minsk, between October 1940 and June 1941. The paper existed for less than a year following the Soviet invasion of Poland, and the annexation of Kresy into Byelorussian SSR. Its purpose was to bring the Soviet mindset closer to the ethnic Poles caught under conditions of occupation. Sztandar Wolności shut down during the subsequent German invasion of the Soviet Union, Operation Barbarossa.

The editorial staff was composed of Belarusians as well as prewar communists from Poland. The editor in-chief was Stefan Majchrowicz and the editorial staff also included Jakub Berman and Janina Broniewska. Meanwhile, all press published by Poland was dismantled and banned by the Red Army Directive # 1 of 16 September 1939, and its paper stock forcibly requisitioned.

Notes

1940 establishments in Belarus
1941 disestablishments in Belarus
Communist newspapers
Mass media in Minsk
Polish-language newspapers
Newspapers established in 1940
Publications disestablished in 1941
Newspapers published in the Soviet Union
Poland–Soviet Union relations